The Constitutional Court of Algeria is Algeria's highest judicial body.

It replaced the Constitutional Council by the Algerian constitutional amendment of 2020 approved by referendum. This revision of the Algerian constitution follows a series of protests known as Hirak.

See also 

 Supreme Court of Algeria
 Constitutional Council (Algeria)

References 

Law of Algeria